Crepis runcinata is a North American species of flowering plant in the family Asteraceae known by the common name fiddleleaf hawksbeard. It is native to western and central Canada (from British Columbia to Manitoba), the western and central United States (from the Pacific as far east as Minnesota, Iowa, western Kansas and northwestern Texas) and northern Mexico (Chihuahua).

Crepis runcinata grows in many types of habitats. It is a variable species with many subspecies. In general it is a perennial herb growing an erect, hairless, mostly leafless, unbranching stem up to about 80 centimeters  (32 inches) tall from a taproot. The hairless leaves are arranged about the base of the plant in a rosette, each somewhat narrowly oval with many toothlike triangular lobes or sometimes lacking lobes. The inflorescence produces flower heads with hairy, glandular phyllaries and many yellow ray florets but no disc florets. The fruit is a small achene with a pappus.

Subspecies
Crepis runcinata subsp. andersonii (A.Gray) Babc. & Stebbins – California, Nevada
Crepis runcinata subsp. barberi (Greenm.) Babc. & Stebbins – Arizona, Nevada, New Mexico, Chihuahua. 
Crepis runcinata subsp. glauca (Nutt.) Babc. & Stebbins – Alberta, Manitoba, Saskatchewan; Arizona, Colorado, Idaho, Montana, North Dakota, Nevada, New Mexico, North Dakota, South Dakota, Texas, Utah, Wyoming
Crepis runcinata subsp. hallii Babc. & Stebbins  – California, Nevada
Crepis runcinata subsp. hispidulosa (Howell ex Howell) Babc. & Stebbins – Alberta, Saskatchewan; Colorado, Idaho, Montana, North Dakota, Oregon, Utah, Washington, Wyoming
Crepis runcinata subsp. imbricata Babc. & Stebbins – Nevada, Oregon
Crepis runcinata subsp. runcinata – Alberta, British Columbia, Manitoba, Saskatchewan; Colorado, Idaho, Minnesota, Montana, Nebraska, Nevada, New Mexico, North Dakota, Oregon, South Dakota, Utah, Washington, Wyoming

References

External links
Jepson Manual Treatment
United States Department of Agriculture Plants Profile
Calphotos Photo gallery, University of California: ssp. hallii

runcinata
Flora of Western Canada
Flora of the Northern United States
Flora of the Northwestern United States
Flora of the Southwestern United States
Flora of California
Flora of the Rocky Mountains
Flora of the Sierra Nevada (United States)
Plants described in 1823
Taxa named by Asa Gray
Taxa named by John Torrey
Flora without expected TNC conservation status